The Wase River is a river in Wase LGA, Plateau State, Nigeria. It is linked with River Benue in Dampar of Ibi Local Government,  Maize, yams , Mango and other farm vegetables are grown on its banks.

References

Vischer, Hans. Journeys in Northern Nigeria
Murphy, John. Distrust of U.S. foils effort to stop crippling disease

Plateau State